Happy Hour is the second full-length album released by British electronic dance music group N-Trance. It was released in the UK in May 1998 and the US on 25 May 1999.

Track listing

Personnel
Nobby - Engineer
Vinny Burns - Guitar
Curds & Whey - Producer, Arranged By
Ricardo da Force - Rap
Jerome Stokes - Vocals
Kelly Llorenna - Vocals
Rod Stewart - Vocals
Lee Limer - Vocals
Gary Crowley - Vocals
Viveen Wray - Vocals
David Grant - Vocals
Steven Berkoff - Vocals
Colin McMillan - Remix

Charts

Release history

References

1998 albums
N-Trance albums
All Around the World Productions albums